Moses ha-Levi ha-Nazir was a  rabbi of the 17th-century. He was the father of Joseph ha-Levi and son-in-law of the Talmudist Abraham ibn Hananiah, rabbi of Hebron and pupil of Joseph di Trani. He is also mentioned as a messenger from the Holy Land. This accounts for the fact that he is met with in many places, including Constantinople, Greece, and Morea.

Sources
 Jewish Encyclopedia bibliography: Chaim Azulai, Shem ha-Gedolim, p. 136.

17th-century rabbis from the Ottoman Empire
Rabbis in Hebron